The Minister of Finance, Trade, Investment and Economic Planning of Seychelles is a cabinet minister in charge of the Ministry for Finance of Seychelles, responsible for public finances of the country. The ministry is located in Central Bank Building in Victoria.

Ministers of Finance
Chamery Chetty, October 1975 - 1978
Maxime Ferrari, 1978
France-Albert René, 1978 - 1989
James Michel , 1989 - 2006
Danny Faure, 2006 - 2012
Pierre Laporte, 2012 - 2015
Jean-Paul Adam, 2015 - 2016
Peter Larose, 2016 - 2018
Maurice Loustau-Lalanne, 2018 - 2020
Naadir Hassan, 2020 -

See also 
 Economy of Seychelles
 Central Bank of Seychelles

References

External links
 Ministry homepage

Government of Seychelles
Government ministers of Seychelles

Economy of Seychelles